Nasty As I Wanna Be is the second album by American rapper, Simon Rex, also known as Dirt Nasty. It was released by Shoot To Kill Music in association with Myspace Records. The title track was released on July 6, 2010 as a teaser for the album. The album title itself is based on the 2 Live Crew album, As Nasty As They Wanna Be.

Background
After success with his self-titled debut album, Dirt Nasty soon began work on a second album. American pop-star Kesha and producer Kool Kojak both contributed significantly towards the album, with Kesha appearing on two songs and co-writing three tracks, and Kool Kojak producing seven tracks off the album. LMFAO, Bonnie McKee, Christian George and various other performers appeared on the album.

Track listing
Liner notes are adapted from Discogs.

References

Footnotes

2010 albums
Simon Rex albums